Xinshi District is one of 7 urban districts of the prefecture-level city of Wulumuqi, the capital of Xinjiang Uygur Autonomous Region, Northwest China. According to the 2002 census, it has a population of 360,000. Diwopu Airport is in the township.

When it existed, China Xinjiang Airlines had its headquarters on the airport property.

References

County-level divisions of Xinjiang
Ürümqi